Shingo Ueno (born 12 November 1973) is a Japanese ski jumper.

In the World Cup he finished once among the top 15, recording a thirteenth place from January 2006 in Sapporo. He made his World Cup debut in January 2002, competing in two races that season, and three races in 2003. In 2003 and 2003 he also finished three times among the top 6 in the Continental Cup.

References

1973 births
Living people
Japanese male ski jumpers